Magnus is a male given name.

People named Magnus include:
 Magnus (Roman usurper) (died 235)
 Magnus (consul 460) (c. 390 or 405–475)
 Magnus Forteman, 8th–9th century Frisian leader
 Magnus (bishop), Roman Catholic Bishop of Turku between 1291 and 1308
 Magnus, Prince of Anhalt-Köthen (1455–1524)
 Magnus W. Alexander, German engineer
 Magnus Arvedson, Swedish ice hockey player
 Magnus Arvidsson, several people
 Magnus Bahne, Finnish footballer
 Magnus Beronius, Swedish Archbishop
 Magnus Bäckstedt, Swedish road cyclist
 Magnus Betnér, Swedish comedian
 Magnus Carlsen, Norwegian chess grandmaster, world chess champion and No. 1 ranked player in the world
 Magnus Cormack, Australian politician
 Magnus Ehrencrona (born 1978), Swedish politician
 Magnus Erlendsson, Earl of Orkney
 Magnus Faxén, Swedish diplomat and journalist
 Magnus Hirschfeld, German physician and sexologist
 Magnus Ilmjärv, Estonian historian 
 Magnus Kirt, Estonian javelin thrower
 Magnus Larsson, former professional tennis player from Sweden
 Magnus Lekven, Norwegian footballer
 Magnus Lindberg, Finnish composer
 Magnus Magnusson, Icelandic-born BBC personality and Mastermind quiz-master
 Magnus Malan, South African soldier and politician
 Magnus Manske, German biochemist and developer, developed first version of MediaWiki software
 Magnus Midtbø, Norwegian rock climber
 Magnus Norman, Swedish former tennis player
 Magnús Óláfsson, King of Mann and the Isles
 Magnus Olson, Swedish Army officer
 Magnús Ver Magnússon, Icelandic four-time World's Strongest Man champion
 Magnus Pyke (1908—1992), British scientist and media figure
 Magnus Samuelsson, Swedish strongman and former World's Strongest Man
 Magnús Scheving, creator and co-star of the children's television show LazyTown
 Magnus Büchel, Liechtenstein judoka
 Magnus Pääjärvi-Svensson, Swedish hockey player
 Magnus Rosén, ex-HammerFall bassist
 Magnus Sjöberg, Swedish jurist
 Quaiapen (1603–1676), also known as Magnus, Native American leader in Rhode Island.

References

Masculine given names